The following is an incomplete list of demolished piers in Hong Kong.

References

Demolished piers in Hong Kong
Piers, demolished